Johann Pistorius (January 1504, Nidda, Hesse  – 25 January 1583, Nidda) was a German Protestant minister and Protestant reformer. From 1541 he was the Superintendent at the church in Nidda in Hesse.

Along with Philipp Melanchthon and Martin Bucer, Pistorius was appointed by Charles V to represent the Protestants at the Diet of Regensburg in 1541. He also participated in the Colloquy of Worms in 1557.

Pistorius was the father of Johann Pistorius (the Younger).

1504 births
1583 deaths
People from Nidda
German Protestant Reformers
German male non-fiction writers